Mirza Ebrahim Khan Rahmani (Akkas Bashi) (1874–1915) was the royal photographer of Mozaffar ad-Din Shah Qajar, the king of Persia. He brought photography to Persia. He later changed his last name to Mossavar-Rahmani.

The first Persian film maker was Mirza Ebrahim Khan Akkas Bashi, the official photographer of the Shah at that time, Mozaffar ad-Din Shah Qajar. In July 1900, while he visited the Paris Exposition and saw the giant Lumière film exhibit, he recorded in his journal: "They erected a very large screen in the centre of the hall, turned off all electric lights and projected the picture of cinematograph on that large screen. Muzaffar Al-din Shah instructed Akkas Bashi to purchase all kinds of it and to bring it to Tehran so that he can make some there". Court photographer Akkas Bashi duly purchased the necessary equipment for the taking and projecting of film, and just one month later he was taking his first films, of the Festival of Flowers in Belgium, on the Shah's visit there. On the Shah's return to Tehran the films were shown to his inner circle of family, ministers and court servants.

See also
 Persian cinema

External links
 

19th-century Iranian people
Iranian cinematographers
Iranian photographers
1874 births
1915 deaths
20th-century Iranian people
People of Qajar Iran